Francis Leach (born 1968) is an Australian radio announcer, sports editor and journalist.

Career
Leach began his career at Triple J in the early 1990s hosting the Three Hours of Power show, the weekly late night heavy metal show. Later on he transferred to Creatures of the Spotlight, the Sunday night arts show. In 2000 he made the switch to The Morning Show, Triple J's daily three-hour talkback and current affairs show. He remained in the role until 2002. During the later part of his Triple J career, he also hosted a Saturday morning sports show at fellow ABC Melbourne station 774 ABC. In 2003 he hosted an arts and music program on Radio National.

In 2004 he joined the commercial station SEN 1116 in Melbourne to host afternoons however he left the station in June 2005 to join DMG Radio Australia's new station Vega FM in both Sydney and Melbourne. At one stage Leach and his wife Lynne Haultain, a radio announcer at 774 ABC, hosted shows that were broadcast during the same time slot.

He signed to return to SEN at the end of February 2007 to host the drive program The Run Home alongside former AFL footballer, David Schwarz. Leach was also host of SEN 1116's coverage of the A League.

In 2012, Leach returned to ABC Radio and joined the ABC Grandstand team, hosting a breakfast show on digital radio.

He is a regular panellist on ABC-TV's Sunday morning sports talk show, Offsiders.

In 2016, Leach joined David Schwarz as co-host of the SEN "Breakfast" show.

In 2018, he was appointed as sports editor at The New Daily.

See also

Radio in Australia

References

1968 births
Living people
Triple J announcers
People educated at St. Bernard's College, Melbourne